Dactinomycin, also known as actinomycin D, is a chemotherapy medication used to treat a number of types of cancer. This includes Wilms tumor, rhabdomyosarcoma, Ewing's sarcoma, trophoblastic neoplasm, testicular cancer, and certain types of ovarian cancer. It is given by injection into a vein.

Most people develop side effects. Common side effects include bone marrow suppression, vomiting, mouth ulcers, hair loss, liver problems, infections, and muscle pains. Other serious side effects include future cancers, allergic reactions, and tissue death at the site of injection. Use in pregnancy may harm the baby. Dactinomycin is in the cytotoxic antibiotic family of medications. It is believed to work by blocking the creation of RNA.

Dactinomycin was approved for medical use in the United States in 1964. It is on the World Health Organization's List of Essential Medicines.

Medical use 
Actinomycin is a clear, yellowish liquid administered intravenously and most commonly used in treatment of a variety of cancers, including:
Gestational trophoblastic neoplasia
Wilms' tumor
Rhabdomyosarcoma
Ewing's sarcoma
Malignant hydatidiform mole
Sometimes it will be combined with other drugs in chemotherapy regimens, like the VAC regimen (with vincristine and cyclophosphamide) for treating rhabdomyosarcoma and Ewing's sarcoma.

It is also used as a radiosensitizer in adjunct to radiotherapies, since it can increase the radiosensitivity of tumor cells by inhibiting repair of sublethal radiation damage and delay the onset of the compensatory hyperplasia that occurs following irradiation.

Side effects 
Common adverse drug reaction includes bone marrow suppression, fatigue, hair loss, mouth ulcer, loss of appetite and diarrhea. Actinomycin is a vesicant, if extravasation occurs.

Mechanism
In cell biology, actinomycin D is shown to have the ability to inhibit transcription. Actinomycin D does this by binding DNA at the transcription initiation complex and preventing elongation of RNA chain by RNA polymerase.

History 
Actinomycin D was the first antibiotic shown to have anti-cancer activity. It was first isolated by Selman Waksman and his co-worker H. Boyd Woodruff in 1940. It was approved by the U.S. Food and Drug Administration (FDA) on December 10, 1964, and launched by Merck Sharp and Dohme under the trade name Cosmegen.

Research use 
Because actinomycin can bind DNA duplexes, it can also interfere with DNA replication, although other chemicals such as hydroxyurea are better suited for use in the laboratory as inhibitors of DNA synthesis.

Actinomycin D and its fluorescent derivative, 7-aminoactinomycin D (7-AAD), are used as stains in microscopy and flow cytometry applications. The affinity of these stains/compounds for GC-rich regions of DNA strands makes them excellent markers for DNA. 7-AAD binds to single stranded DNA; therefore it is a useful tool in determining apoptosis and distinguishing between dead cells and live ones.

References

External links 
 

Polypeptide antibiotics
DNA replication inhibitors
Depsipeptides
Cyclic peptides
IARC Group 3 carcinogens
World Health Organization essential medicines
Wikipedia medicine articles ready to translate
DNA intercalaters